Super Dimension may refer to:

It was produced in Japan during the early eighties, financed by Big West Advertising, composed of the following unrelated shows:
Super Dimension Fortress Macross, a 1982 Japanese anime television series by Big West Advertising and Tatsunoko Production. Later the series was spun off as its own media franchise.
Super Dimension Century Orguss, a 1983 Japanese anime television series by Big West Advertising and Tokyo Movie Shinsha
Super Dimension Cavalry Southern Cross, a 1984 Japanese anime television series by Big West Advertising and Tatsunoko Production
The Super Dimension Fortress Macross: Do You Remember Love?, a 1984 Japanese anime film based on The Super Dimension Fortress Macross by Big West Advertising and Tatsunoko Production
The Super Dimension Fortress Macross: Flash Back 2012, a 1987 Japanese original video animation by Big West Advertising and Tatsunoko Production
Super Dimensional Fortress Macross II: Lovers Again, a 1992–1993 Japanese original video animation, film, and manga sequel to The Super Dimension Fortress Macross series by AIC and Oniro

In video games:
The Super Dimension Fortress Macross, a 1985 Japanese game for the Nintendo Famicom
Super Dimension Fortress Macross: Scrambled Valkyrie, a 1993 Japanese 2D shooting game for the Super Famicom
The Super Dimension Fortress Macross: Do You Remember Love?, a 1997 2D shooting game for the Sega Saturn
The Super Dimension Fortress Macross, a 2003 Japanese 3D shooting game for the PlayStation 2

 
Real robot anime and manga